Carex lushanensis is a tussock-forming perennial in the family Cyperaceae. It is native to parts of Africa.

See also
 List of Carex species

References

mildbraediana
Plants described in 1909
Taxa named by Georg Kükenthal
Flora of Rwanda
Flora of Burundi